Halls is the brand name of a popular mentholated cough drop. Halls cough drops (categorised as a cough suppressant/oral anaesthetic by the manufacturer) are sold by the Cadbury-Adams Division of Cadbury, now owned by Mondelēz International, and have long been advertised as featuring "vapour action".

Halls was first made in the 1930s in Stanley Road, Whitefield, Lancashire, United Kingdom by the Hall Brothers company which was founded in 1893 by Thomas Harold & Norman Smith  Hall. Hall Brothers was acquired by Warner-Lambert in 1964. Production in Whitefield ceased in the late 1980s. When Pfizer acquired Warner-Lambert in 2000, the Halls brand came with the entire Adams portfolio (which included Trident gum, Dentyne, Chiclets, and Freshen Up among others). Two years later Adams was bought out by Cadbury, which was  purchased by Kraft foods and later restructured. It was renamed Mondelēz International – as of 2015 Mondelēz International owns the Halls brand worldwide.

Drug information

Halls contain menthol, which acts as local anaesthetic and "creates a cooling sensation". It also acts as a cough suppressant.

Additional information

In some parts of the world, including Brazil, Argentina, Peru, Ecuador, Colombia, the Philippines, and Pakistan, Halls is advertised as a mentholated hard candy and is not recognised as a medicine for coughs. In the UK, Halls Extra Strong has recently dropped all mention of an active ingredient (or of coughs) from the packaging, and now describes the contents as "Extra Strong Original flavour hard boiled sweets."

In 2016, Halls was one of the biggest selling branded over-the-counter medications sold in Great Britain, with sales of £32.5 million.

References

External links
Halls main website

Throat lozenges
Cadbury Adams brands
Products introduced in 1930
Mondelez International brands
British confectionery
Breath mints
Brand name confectionery